There have been four baronetcies created for persons with the surname Miller, two in the Baronetage of England, one in the Baronetage of Great Britain and one in the Baronetage of the United Kingdom. Two of the creations are extant as of 2008.

The Miller Baronetcy, of Oxenhoath in the County of Kent, was created in the Baronetage of England on 13 October 1660 for Humphrey Miller. He was High Sheriff of Kent in 1666. The title became extinct on the death of the second Baronet in 1714.

The Miller Baronetcy, of Chichester in the County of Sussex, was created in the Baronetage of England on 29 October 1705 for Thomas Miller, Member of Parliament for Chichester. His father Mark Miller was an Alderman and Mayor of Chichester. The second Baronet represented Chichester and Sussex in the House of Commons. The third Baronet was Member of Parliament for Chichester. The fifth Baronet sat as Member of Parliament for Lewes and Portsmouth. Another member of the family to gain distinction was the Hon. Sir Henry Miller, second son of the sixth Baronet. He was Speaker of the New Zealand Legislative Council from 1892 to 1903.

The Miller Baronetcy, of Glenlee in the Stewartry of Kirkcudbright, was created in the Baronetage of Great Britain on 3 March 1788 for Thomas Miller, Lord President of the Court of Session with the judicial title of Lord Glenlee. The second Baronet was a Lord of Session with the judicial title of Lord Glenlee and also represented Edinburgh in the House of Commons. The seventh Baronet was Chairman of the Suffolk County Council between 1988 and 1989.

The Miller Baronetcy, of Manderston in the County of Berwick, was created in the Baronetage of the United Kingdom on 24 March 1874 for the diplomat and politician William Miller. The title became extinct on the death of his younger son, the third Baronet, in 1918. The family seat was Manderston, Duns, Berwickshire.

Miller baronets, of Oxenhoath (1660)

Sir Humphrey Miller, 1st Baronet (died 1709)
Sir Borlase Miller, 2nd Baronet (died 1714)

Miller baronets, of Chichester (1705)

Sir Thomas Miller, 1st Baronet (c. 1635–1705)
Sir John Miller, 2nd Baronet (1665–1721)
Sir Thomas Miller, 3rd Baronet (–1733)
Sir John Miller, 4th Baronet (died 1772)
Sir Thomas Miller, 5th Baronet (–1816)
Sir Thomas Combe Miller, 6th Baronet (1781–1864)
Sir Charles Hayes Miller, 7th Baronet (1829–1868)
Sir Charles John Hubert Miller, 8th Baronet (1858–1940)
Sir Henry Holmes Miller, 9th Baronet (1865–1952)
Sir Ernest Henry John Miller, 10th Baronet (1897–1960)
Sir John Holmes Miller, 11th Baronet (1925–1995)
Sir Harry Miller, 12th Baronet (1927–2007)
Sir Anthony Thomas Miller, 13th Baronet (born 1955)

The heir apparent is Thomas Kensington Miller (born 1994).

Miller baronets, of Glenlee (1788)

Sir Thomas Miller, 1st Baronet (1717–1789)
Sir William Miller, 2nd Baronet (1755–1846)
Thomas Miller (died 1827)
Sir William Miller, 3rd Baronet (1815–1861)
Sir Thomas Macdonald Miller, 4th Baronet (1846–1875)
William Frederic Miller (1863–1868)
Sir William Frederick Miller, 5th Baronet (1868–1948)
Lieutenant Frederick William Joseph Macdonald Miller (1891–1917)
Sir Alastair George Lionel Joseph Miller, 6th Baronet (1893–1964)
Sir Frederick William Macdonald Miller, 7th Baronet (1920–1991)
Sir Stephen William Macdonald Miller, 8th Baronet (born 1953)

The heir apparent is James Stephen Macdonald Miller of Glenlee, the younger (born 1981).

Miller baronets, of Manderston (1874)

Sir William Miller, 1st Baronet (1809–1887)
Sir James Miller, 2nd Baronet (1864–1906)
Sir John Alexander Miller, 3rd Baronet (27 September 1867 – 16 February 1918). Miller inherited the baronetcy from his brother, James Miller. In 1899 he was appointed a Justice of the Peace and magistrate for Kent. At the time of his first marriage, 1889, John Alexander Miller was stated to be a bachelor and landed proprietor living at Manderston, Duns, Berwickshire. However, by 1903 John Alexander Miller's country address is Bifrons, Patrixbourne, Canterbury, Kent. His town address was 31 Cadogan Square, Chelsea, London. He married three times: Firstly on 19 September 1889 in a Scottish Episcopalian service at Ayton Castle, Berwickshire, the family seat of the bride, Inez Mary (born 1867, Toronto, Canada, d. 19 April 1938), eldest child of William Mitchell-Innes (1841–1879), Captain, 13th Hussars by his spouse Agnes (1850–?), daughter of Henry Young Hulbert (1812–1864). Inez divorced her husband on 1 February 1901. Secondly in 1901, London as her third husband, Ada Mary (1869–1938), daughter of Francis Henry Paget (1840–1921), Lieutenant Prince Albert's Own Leics. Yeo. Cavalry, by his spouse Edith Mary (circa 1845–1889), daughter of William Henry Higgins (1818–1891), sometime Master of the Court of Bankruptcy. Ada divorced her husband in 1906.  Sir John inherited the baronetcy upon his brother's death in 1906, and the following year married, thirdly, Eveline Frances (1869–1941), daughter of Colonel John Blencowe Cookson, C.B. (1843–1910), by his spouse, Constance Jane (1847–1926), daughter of George Fenwick, Esq., (1811 – post 1861) There was no issue from any of the marriages and the baronetcy became extinct. Manderston was entailed to Amy, (Mrs Thomas Bailie), Sir John's eldest sister.

Notes

References
Kidd, Charles, Williamson, David (editors). Debrett's Peerage and Baronetage (1990 edition). New York: St Martin's Press, 1990, 

Burke's Peerage & Baronetage, 61st edition, London, 1899,
Kelly's Handbook of the Titled and Official Classes, London, 1903, p. 1040.
 Ruvigny and Raineval, The Marquis of, The Blood Royal of Britain – Tudor Roll, London, 1903, p. 550.

Baronetcies in the Baronetage of England
Baronetcies in the Baronetage of Great Britain
Extinct baronetcies in the Baronetage of England
Extinct baronetcies in the Baronetage of the United Kingdom
1660 establishments in England
1788 establishments in Great Britain
1874 establishments in the United Kingdom